Sir Separanlu-ye Olya (also Romanized as Sīr Seprānlū-ye ‘Olyā and Sīrseprānlū-ye ‘Olyā; also known as Sīr Separānlū-ye Bālā, Sīrseparānlū Bālā, and Sīsparānlū-ye Bālā) is a village in Jirestan Rural District, Sarhad District, Shirvan County, North Khorasan Province, Iran. At the 2006 census, its population was 196, in 37 families.

References 

Populated places in Shirvan County